San Gregorio Creek (Spanish for: Saint Gregory) is a river in San Mateo County, California. Its tributaries originate on the western ridges of  the Santa Cruz Mountains whence it courses southwest through steep forested canyons. The San Gregorio Creek mainstem begins at the confluence of Alpine and La Honda Creeks, whence it flows  through rolling grasslands and pasturelands until it meets the Pacific Ocean at San Gregorio State Beach. It traverses the small unincorporated communities of La Honda, San Gregorio, Redwood Terrace and Sky Londa.

History
San Gregorio Creek is historically significant as the campsite for Spanish explorer Gaspar de Portolà's expedition from October 24–27, 1769, when he overshot his goal (Monterey Bay) and went on to Pacifica where he ascended Sweeney Ridge and discovered San Francisco Bay. The site is registered as California Historical Landmark 26. The creek was called Arroyo de San Gregorio in Spanish times and later, Arroyo Rodrigues in the 1850s.

Watershed
The mainstem of San Gregorio Creek begins at the confluence of Alpine Creek and La Honda Creek in La Honda, and flows  to its mouth at San Gregorio State Beach in San Gregorio.

The creek ends in a lagoon primarily in the incised channel upstream from the Highway 1 Bridge. Coho salmon do not rear in the lagoon but outgoing smolts use it to physiologically prepare for migration to saltwater.

This river floods occasionally on its path down CA Route 84 towards the Pacific Ocean, most famously during the 1997 El Niño.

Ecology
In the 1800s the creek had large enough salmon runs to support commercial harvest (Skinner, 1962). As part of the southern range of the Central California Coast Coho Evolutionarily Significant Unit (ESU), the creek is considered an attractive site for re-stocking. In fact, in 1998 the Draft Strategic Plan for Restoration of Endangered Coho Salmon South of San Francisco Bay identified San Gregorio Creek and its tributaries as one of nine creeks in which recovery of coho salmon (Oncorhynchus kisutch) is a priority. South of San Francisco to Monterey Bay the coho salmon was listed by the State of California as endangered in 1995. The San Gregorio watershed has seen recently increasing residential development but remains primarily pastoral with cattle and sheep grazing, timber harvesting, and recreational trails being the main commercial uses. Because of the large private ownership and development potential, water diversions and low base flows are an important issue in this watershed. In 1993, water rights in the San Gregorio watershed were adjudicated and a minimum stream bypass flow was established. However, the prescribed bypass flows are too low to assure viable coho salmon populations.

San Gregorio Creek is also part of the Central California Coast steelhead (Oncorhynchus mykiss irideus) ESU and historically supported a run of 1,000 fish as recently as 1971.

In 2007, the San Gregorio Creek watershed was targeted by the California Department of Fish and Game for salmon recovery.

In a 2008 survey, both coho salmon and steelhead were noted in the creek but threatened by Highway 84 related barriers to fish passage, as well as pressure from sedimentation from residential development, grazing and logging. The primary threat to salmonids in this report were bridge culverts at three sites which impede fish passage during low creek flows, and one site where a culvert from a small tributary is completely impassable in any season.

Four special-status animal species - California red-legged frog (Rana draytonii), coho salmon, steelhead, and tidewater goby are the focus of a June 2010 Watershed Management Plan.

Western leatherwood (Dirca occidentalis), Santa Cruz manzanita (Arctostaphylos andersonii), and King’s Mountain manzanita (Arctostaphylos regismontana), which are all included in the California Native Plant Society's Inventory of Rare and Endangered Plants of California, have been documented in the La Honda Creek Open Space Preserve.

Tributaries
From mouth to head:
Palmer Gulch
Coyote Creek
Clear Creek
El Corte de Madera Creek
Pine Tree Gulch
Bogess Creek
Kingston Creek (left bank)
Harrington Creek
La Honda Creek
Woodhams Creek
Langley Creek
Woodruff Creek
Weeks Creek
Spanish Ranch Creek
Alpine Creek
Mindego Creek
Rodgers Gulch

See also
San Gregorio State Beach
List of watercourses in the San Francisco Bay Area

References

Rivers of San Mateo County, California
Santa Cruz Mountains
Rivers of Northern California